Renodes is a genus of moths in the family Erebidae. The genus was erected by Achille Guenée in 1852.

Species
The following species are included in the genus.
Renodes aequalis Walker, 1865
Renodes albilimbata Hampson, 1926
Renodes apicosa Guenée, 1852
Renodes brevipalpis Guenée, 1852
Renodes brunnea Cramer, 1780
Renodes chacma Schaus, 1901
Renodes croceiceps Walk, 1865
Renodes curvicosta Guenée, 1852
Renodes curviluna (H. Druce, 1890)
Renodes diffidens Schaus, 1901
Renodes eupithecioides Walker, 1858
Renodes flavilimbata Hampson, 1926
Renodes fuscula Heyden, 1891
Renodes liturata Walker, 1865
Renodes moha Dognin, 1897
Renodes nephrophora Wallengren, 1860
Renodes nigrilinea Guenée, 1852
Renodes phaeoscia Hampson, 1926
Renodes subfixa Walker, 1865
Renodes vulgaris Butler, 1879

References

Eulepidotinae
Moth genera